Ovidiu Cernăuțeanu (born 23 August 1974), also known by his stage names Ovi Martin, Ovi Jacobsen, or simply Ovi, is a Romanian-Norwegian singer and songwriter. After being raised in Botoșani, he moved to Norway in 1995.

He rose to fame in Norway in 2006 when he first took part in the Melodi Grand Prix 2006 with the song "The Better Side of Me" where he did not qualify to the final. The next year he was a finalist of the Melodi Grand Prix 2009 with the song "Seven Seconds" but lost to Alexander Rybak. In 2010 he participated in the Selecția Națională 2010 for Romania alongside duet partner Paula Seling. They won with the song "Playing with Fire" with which they represented Romania in the Eurovision Song Contest 2010. They qualified for the grand final where they took the third position, only behind winner Germany and runner-up Turkey. After Eurovision, Ovi released a new duet with Seling; "We Got Something".

In 2012 he was back in the Melodi Grand Prix 2012 this time as a songwriter along with Thomas G:son and Tommy Berre for the song "High on Love" as performed by Reidun Sæther. The song qualified for the final. Apart from the European recognition, Ovi has also entered several music charts with songs like "Seven Seconds" (2009), "Playing with Fire" (2010) or "We Got Something" (2011) – the latter two are featuring Paula Seling. He is also the Popularity Award winner of the 2009 Golden Stag Festival in Romania.

In 2014 he returned to Eurovision Song Contest 2014 together with duet partner Paula Seling when they participated for Romania with the song "Miracle". The same year Ovi co-wrote the song She's After My Piano for the group 2 Fabiola who participated in the Belgium national selection for Eurovision Song Contest 2014. The song did not win in Belgium but became a major hit for 2 Fabiola. Later Ovi and Paula Seling recorded their own version of the song for Ovi's album A Bit of Pop Won't Hurt Anyone, 5 May 2014 (daWorks).

Melodi Grand Prix 
Ovidiu Cernăuțeanu submitted several songs written and performed by himself for the Melodi Grand Prix selections in the last 2000s but was only selected towards the semi-finals twice. In 2008 his entry had no success, while in the Melodi Grand Prix 2009 he was in for the Final on 21 February with the song "Seven Seconds" but did not qualify for the Golden Final. The song was even though a mild chart success, entering the top-fifteen of the VG-lista at number-twelve.

Eurovision Song Contest 2010 
Cernăuțeanu represented Romania in the Eurovision Song Contest 2010 (as Ovi) in a duet with Paula Seling. They performed "Playing with Fire", which was composed by Cernăuțeanu himself.
They passed the second semi-final, where they were the fourth. In the Grand Final, Seling and Ovi performed the nineteenth (after France and before Russia). At the voting, they got 164 points and classed the third that night, equaling the best result for Romania in the contest. They received 12 points from Moldova, 10 points from United Kingdom, Norway, Spain, Portugal, Sweden, etc. Only eight countries did not give the top ten points to them that night.

On 1 March 2014, Paula Seling and Ovi won the Romanian national selection Selecția Națională 2014 and were selected as the Romanian entry for the Eurovision Song Contest 2014 in Copenhagen with the song "Miracle". The duo came 12th place receiving 12 points only from Moldova.

References

External links

Eurovision Song Contest entrants for Romania
Eurovision Song Contest entrants of 2010
Eurovision Song Contest entrants of 2014
Living people
Romanian emigrants to Norway
Spanish-language singers of Romania
1974 births
People from Botoșani
Norwegian singer-songwriters
Norwegian pop singers
Norwegian people of Romanian descent
Romanian male pop singers
Romanian singer-songwriters
Romanian pianists
Norwegian male pianists
21st-century Norwegian singers
21st-century Romanian singers
21st-century pianists
21st-century Norwegian male singers
Melodi Grand Prix contestants